James Edward Ramsden    (1 November 1923 – 29 March 2020) was a British Conservative politician. He was the last person to hold the office of Secretary of State for War.

Background
Ramsden was born in Liverpool in 1923, the son of Captain Edward Ramsden and his wife Geraldine. His father was a brother of George Taylor Ramsden, a Coalition Unionist MP for Elland, while his mother was a sister of brothers Sir Frank O'Brien Wilson (a Royal Navy officer and early settler of Kenya) and Sir Murrough John Wilson (a Conservative MP for Richmond, Yorkshire). During the Second World War, he served as a lieutenant with the King's Royal Rifle Corps.

Political career
Ramsden sat as Member of Parliament for Harrogate from 1954 to 1974. He served under Harold Macmillan as Under-Secretary of State and Financial Secretary for War from 1960 to 1963 and under Sir Alec Douglas-Home as Secretary of State for War from 1963 to 1964. At the April 1964 reshuffle, the former cabinet positions of First Lord of the Admiralty and Secretary of State for Air, along with Ramsden's post, were incorporated into an expanded Ministry of Defence, under the leadership of the new position of Secretary of State for Defence. Ramsden was appointed Minister of State for the Army at the Ministry of Defence, a post he held until the Douglas-Home government fell in October 1964. He was sworn in as a member of the Privy Council in 1963.

Ramsden was interviewed in 2012 as part of The History of Parliament's oral history project.

Personal life
Ramsden married Juliet Ponsonby, daughter of Conservative politician Charles Ponsonby. Their youngest child was the artist Charlotte Cheverton, who died in a car accident in 1991.

He died in March 2020 at the age of 96.

References

Rulers.org page on UK government officials (search for "Ramsden")

1923 births
2020 deaths
Military personnel from Liverpool
Conservative Party (UK) MPs for English constituencies
British Secretaries of State
UK MPs 1951–1955
UK MPs 1955–1959
UK MPs 1959–1964
UK MPs 1964–1966
UK MPs 1966–1970
UK MPs 1970–1974
Members of the Privy Council of the United Kingdom
Ministers in the Macmillan and Douglas-Home governments, 1957–1964
British Army personnel of World War II
King's Royal Rifle Corps officers